Burgersdorp is a village in Mopani District Municipality in the Limpopo province of South Africa. Burgersdorp is located 32 km south east of Tzaneen on the R36 road to Lydenburg.

References

Populated places in the Greater Tzaneen Local Municipality